Mohamed Fathalla Difallah (born 26 August 1987 in Alexandria) is an Egyptian long jumper. He competed in the long jump event at the 2012 Summer Olympics.

References

Sportspeople from Alexandria
Egyptian male long jumpers
1987 births
Living people
Olympic athletes of Egypt
Athletes (track and field) at the 2012 Summer Olympics